David Smith (born 21 June 1962 in Kingston upon Hull, East Riding of Yorkshire) is a retired hammer thrower from Great Britain.

Athletics career
Smith represented the United Kingdom in the men's hammer throw event at the 1988 Summer Olympics in Seoul, South Korea. There he finished in 23rd place, having thrown 69.12 metres in the qualifying round. Smith set his personal best (77.30 metres) in 1985. He represented England and won a gold medal, at the 1986 Commonwealth Games in Edinburgh, Scotland. Four years later he represented England and won a silver medal, at the 1990 Commonwealth Games in Auckland, New Zealand.

Personal life
He is the father of active British hammer thrower Alex Smith.

International competitions

References

 
 Profile at The Power of Ten
 British Olympic Committee

1962 births
Living people
Sportspeople from Kingston upon Hull
British male hammer throwers
English male hammer throwers
Olympic athletes of Great Britain
Athletes (track and field) at the 1988 Summer Olympics
Commonwealth Games silver medallists for England
Commonwealth Games gold medallists for England
Commonwealth Games medallists in athletics
Athletes (track and field) at the 1986 Commonwealth Games
Athletes (track and field) at the 1990 Commonwealth Games
Athletes (track and field) at the 1998 Commonwealth Games
World Athletics Championships athletes for Great Britain
Medallists at the 1986 Commonwealth Games
Medallists at the 1990 Commonwealth Games